Diademaproetus is an extinct genus of trilobites in the family Tropidocoryphidae. There are at least four described species in Diademaproetus.

Species
These species belong to the genus Diademaproetus:
 Diademaproetus dianae Viersen, 2015
 Diademaproetus mohamedi Chatterton et al., 2006
 Diademaproetus pertinax Viersen, Taghon & Magrean, 2019
 Diademaproetus rhenanus
 Diademaproetus issoumourensis Molinaro, 2012
 Diademaproetus cf. antatlasius Alberti, 1969
 Diademaproetus praecursor  Alberti, 1969

References

Proetida